Janalikot is a wada no. 2 of Bannigadhi Jayagadh Rural Municipality in Achham District in Sudurpashchim Province of western Nepal. At the time of the 1991 Nepal census, the village had a population of 1772 living in 387 houses. At the time of the 2001 Nepal census, the population was 2017, of which 48% was literate.

References

Populated places in Achham District
Village development committees in Achham District